During the French Revolution, a constitutional bishop was a Catholic bishop elected from among the clergy who had sworn to uphold the Civil Constitution of the Clergy between 1791 and 1801.

History 
Constitutional bishops were often priests with less or more moderate Gallican and partisan ideas, of a less or moderate nature. They were elected locally by the same body of electors that elected the députés of the future Legislative Assembly. They organised national councils in 1797 and 1801 to mark their independence from the pope, who usually called major ecclesiastical councils (unlike minor synods).
 
On the signature of the 1801 concordat, pope Pius VII and Napoleon I of France both demanded that the constitutional bishops and the remaining Ancien Régime bishops who had not sworn to uphold the Civil Constitution all resign their episcopal seats so that new holders could be appointed to the sees. 15 constitutional bishops refused to resign, feeling that their election to their episcopal seats were still valid (one such bishop, Henri Grégoire, signed himself as bishop of Loir-et-Cher right up until his death).

Selected constitutional bishops 
It is notable that a constitutional bishop's diocese was not named after his cathedra or episcopal seat (as was previous practise) but after the department (themselves mostly named after natural features like rivers or mountain ranges) corresponding to his diocese, following the re-drawing of the diocesan boundaries according to the department boundaries created in 1790.
 Yves Marie Audrein, bishop of Finistère in Brittany
 Jean-Baptiste-Luc Bailly, bishop of Poitiers
 Louis Belmas, bishop of Aude
 Claude Debertier, bishop of Aveyron
 Jean-Baptiste Demandre, bishop of Doubs
 Charles-François Dorlodot, bishop of Mayenne
 Louis-Alexandre Expilly de la Poipe, bishop of Finistère, the first constitutional bishop to be elected
 Claude Fauchet (revolutionist), bishop of Calvados in Normandy
 Léonard Honoré Gay de Vernon, bishop of Haute-Vienne
 Jean-Baptiste Gobel, bishop of Paris
 Henri Grégoire, bishop of Loir-et-Cher, better known as abbé Grégoire
 Marc-Antoine Huguet (1757-1796), bishop of Creuse (executed by firing squad on 124 Fructidor, year 4)
 Louis Jarente de Sénac d'Orgeval, bishop of Loiret
 Antoine-Adrien Lamourette, bishop of Rhône-et-Loire (Lyon)
 Jean-Claude Leblanc de Beaulieu, Arch?bishop of Rouen in Normandy
René Lecesve, bishop of Poitiers.
Claude Le Coz, bishop of Ille-et-Vilaine
Jean-Baptiste Massieu, bishop of Oise in Picardy
 Charles II Montault-Désilles, bishop of Maine et Loire (Angers)
 Hugues Pelletier, bishop of Maine et Loire (Angers) in Anjou
 Michel-Joseph de Pidoll, bishop of Sarthe
 Pierre Pontard, bishop of Dordogne 
 François-Ambroise Rodrigue, bishop of Vendée
 Barthélémy-Jean-Baptiste Sanadon, bishop of Basses-Pyrénées
 Jean-Baptiste Pierre Saurine, bishop of Landes
 Noël-Gabriel-Luce Villar, bishop of Mayenne

References

Bibliography 
  Rodney J. Dean, L'Église constitutionnelle, Napoléon et le Concordat de 1801, Paris, Picard, 2004, 737 p. (French edition)
  Edmond Préclin, Les Jansénistes du XVIIIe siècle et la Constitution civile du clergé. Le développement du richérisme. Sa propagation dans le bas clergé. 1713-1791, Paris, librairie universitaire J. Gamber, 1929, 578 p.

 
Religion and the French Revolution
Catholic Church in France
1791 establishments in France
1801 disestablishments
First French Empire